The 2002 Canada Masters doubles was the men's doubles event of the one hundred and thirteenth edition of the Canada Masters; a WTA Tier I tournament and the most prestigious men's tennis tournament held in Canada. Jiří Novák and David Rikl were the defending champions but they competed with different partners that year, Novák with Radek Štěpánek and Rikl with David Prinosil. Novak and Štěpánek lost in the second round to Mark Knowles and Daniel Nestor. Prinosil and Rikl lost in the semifinals to Bob Bryan and Mike Bryan. The Bryans won in the final 4–6, 7–6(7–1), 6–3 against Knowles and Nestor.

Seeds
Champion seeds are indicated in bold text while text in italics indicates the round in which those seeds were eliminated.

Draw

Finals

Top half

Bottom half

External links
 2002 Canada Masters Doubles Draw

2002 Canada Masters and the Rogers AT&T Cup
Doubles